A list of notable people from Kathmandu, Nepal:

Politics
Gunakamadeva - founder of the city
Mahendra of Nepal
Dhyan Govinda Ranjit
Dilli Raman Regmi
Birendra Shah
Shukraraj Shastri - martyr of Nepal
Gangalal Shrestha - martyr of Nepal
Pushpa Lal Shrestha
Ganesh Man Singh - supremo leader of Nepal and commander of the 1990s people's movement
Prakash Man Singh

Medicine

Bhagawan Koirala - A cardiac surgeon, author and social worker. 

Bhola Rijal - A gynaecologist, artist and social worker. 

Om Murti Anil - A cardiologist, author and social worker.

Sports
Baikuntha Manandhar

Entertainment
Hari Bansha Acharya
Narayan Gopal - Emperor of Voice
Manisha Koirala - Bollywood actress
Dilkrishna Shrestha - actor, film producer
Madan Krishna Shrestha

Literature
Nisthananda Bajracharya - one of the four main writers during Nepal Bhasa renaissance
Bhawani Bhikshu - the greatest poet of Nepal
Chittadhar Hridaya - modern poet
Gopal Prasad Rimal

See also
 List of people from Pokhara

Kathmandu
People
Kathmandu